Neesham is a surname. Notable people with the surname include:

 David Neesham (born 1946), Australian water polo player
 Gerard Neesham (born 1954), Australian football player
 James Neesham (born 1990), New Zealand cricketer
 Tim Neesham (born 1979), Australian water polo player